Claude Ganser (born 7 September 1967) is a retired Luxembourgian football defender. He was awarded Luxembourgish Footballer of the Year in 1992.

References

1967 births
Living people
Luxembourgian footballers
Union Luxembourg players
Jeunesse Esch players
F91 Dudelange players
Association football defenders
Luxembourg international footballers